Anissa Khedher (born 1 April 1980) is a French politician of La République En Marche! (LREM) who served as a member of the French National Assembly from 2017 to 2022, representing the department of Rhône.

Political career
In parliament, Khedher served as member of the Committee on National Defence and the Armed Forces. In addition to her committee assignments, she was part of the Assembly's delegation to the NATO Parliamentary Assembly. She is also a member of the parliamentary friendship groups with Oman and Tunisia. In 2020, Khedher joined En commun (EC), a group within LREM led by Barbara Pompili.

Khedher lost her seat in the first round of the 2022 French legislative election.

Political positions
In July 2019, Khedher decided not to align with her parliamentary group's majority and became one of 52 LREM members who abstained from a vote on the French ratification of the European Union’s Comprehensive Economic and Trade Agreement (CETA) with Canada.

See also
 2017 French legislative election

References

1980 births
Living people
Deputies of the 15th National Assembly of the French Fifth Republic
La République En Marche! politicians
21st-century French women politicians
Politicians from Auvergne-Rhône-Alpes
People from Vénissieux
Women members of the National Assembly (France)
French people of Tunisian descent
Members of Parliament for Rhône